The 2022 Monaco ePrix was a Formula E electric car race held at the Circuit de Monaco on 30 April 2022. It served as the sixth round of the 2021–22 Formula E season, and marked the fifth edition of the event. The track was slightly revised, with the reprofiled Nouvelle Chicane used in 2021 being scrapped, making this the first time the traditional Monaco Grand Prix layout was used in Formula E. Stoffel Vandoorne won the race to claim the lead of the championship, while pole-sitter Mitch Evans and previous championship leader Jean-Éric Vergne rounded out the podium.

Classification

Qualifying

Qualifying duels

Overall classification 

Notes:
  – Sam Bird received a 3-place grid penalty for causing a collision in the previous race in Rome.

Race

Notes:
  – Pole position.
  – Fastest lap.
  – Antonio Giovinazzi received a 5-second time penalty for leaving the track and gaining an advantage.

References

|- style="text-align:center"
|width="35%"|Previous race:2022 Rome ePrix
|width="30%"|FIA Formula E World Championship2021–22 season
|width="35%"|Next race:2022 Berlin ePrix
|- style="text-align:center"
|width="35%"|Previous race:2021 Monaco ePrix
|width="30%"|Monaco ePrix
|width="35%"|Next race:2023 Monaco ePrix
|- style="text-align:center"

2022
2021–22 Formula E season
2022 in Monegasque motorsport
April 2022 sports events in Europe